The West River Drive Bridge is a steel girder bridge built in 1966 over the Schuylkill River on West River Drive (since renamed Martin Luther King, Jr. Drive) in Philadelphia, Pennsylvania. The Pennsylvania Department of Transportation owns and maintains the bridge. The western end of this bridge is upstream from the western end of the Spring Garden Street Bridge, but the eastern end of this bridge is downstream from the eastern end of the Spring Garden Street Bridge.

Gallery

See also
 List of crossings of the Schuylkill River

References

Bridges in Philadelphia
Bridges over the Schuylkill River
Bridges completed in 1966
Road bridges in Pennsylvania
Steel bridges in the United States
Girder bridges in the United States